Commstock is an annual concert event in San Antonio, Texas hosted by Communications Arts High School, but typically takes place at William Howard Taft High School. The title "Commstock" is a play-on-words of the famous Woodstock concert of 1969.

Commstock usually consists of mainly rock music, usually played by the students. However, any genre of music can be played at the festival.

Commstock typically takes place in the evening on a Friday, usually during either November or December, and lasts 3–4 hours. Student bands who play at the festival typically stay after school to set up, practice, or prepare.

Notable bands to play the event include the successful Austin, Texas based group Ghost Lapse and the now defunct rock n' roll band Handsome Genius.

Sources
http://www.nisd.net/communicationsarts/

Annual events in Texas
Rock festivals in the United States